Ion Dacian, born Ion Pulcă (11 October 19118 December 1981) was a Romanian tenor known especially as a light opera singer.

He was born in 1911 in Saschiz, Mureș County. Dacian studied in parallel and graduated both from the Law Faculty and the Music Academy of Cluj. His canto teacher was Ion Crișan. He died in 1981 in Bucharest.

1911 births
1981 deaths
People from Mureș County
Romanian operatic tenors
20th-century Romanian male opera singers
Gheorghe Dima Music Academy alumni